Ideal TV (also called the TV Ideal or just Ideal) is a Brazilian broadcast television channel with 24 hours of programming dedicated to professional Brazilians. It made its first broadcast exclusively by subscription television on 1 October 2007, at 20:30. The channel closed on Monday, 20 July 2009.

On 1 October 2013 the channel returned to broadcast television, replacing MTV Brasil, which was operated by Grupo Abril. The channel went on the air 00:01, replacing MTV Brasil which is now just called MTV, now operated by ViacomCBS.

The channel
Information and entertainment are the formula to attract an audience of professionals who live the daily challenge of showing good results for the company remain competitive in the labor market and still have time for personal life. The schedule consists of three core programs: business management, career management and good living. With this, the Ideal TV falls within the segment, as recent definition of the English newspaper Financial Times, "business television", niche TV that is becoming highly popular in Europe and United States. The initial grid has 18 self-produced programs, and other purchased of producing national and international (including the BBC).

At 23:59 on 20 July 2009, the Ideal TV ceased transmissions. But then at 00:01 on 1 October 2013, Ideal TV resumed transmissions, replacing the channel space used by MTV Brasil.

Closure
On 7 December 2020, Ideal TV was replaced by Loading, which focuses on pop culture, geek culture and Asian productions such as Anime, Tokusatsu, Korean drama and K-Pop music as well as films, videogames and eSports. Original content would also be produced for the network. Ideal TV stayed on analogue satellite feeds where it remain unchanged.

External links
 idealtv.com.br (archived)

Television networks in Brazil
Grupo Abril
Television channels and stations established in 2007
Television channels and stations disestablished in 2009
Television channels and stations established in 2013
Portuguese-language television networks